The 2011 edition of the women's basketball tournament of the African Games was the 10th, organized by FIBA Africa and played under the auspices of FIBA, the basketball sport governing body. The tournament was held from 2 to 12 September 2011 in Maputo, Mozambique, contested by 12 national teams and won by Senegal.

Draw

Squads

Preliminary round

Times given below are in UTC+2.

Group A

Group B

Knockout stage

Championship bracket

Quarterfinals

Semifinals

Third place game

Final

5–8th place bracket

Semifinals

Seventh place game

Fifth place game

9–12th place bracket

Semifinals

Eleventh place game

Ninth place game

Final standings

Awards

All-Tournament Team

See also
2011 FIBA Africa Championship for Women

References

 
Basketball at the African Games – Women's tournament
Basketball at the 2011 All-Africa Games
International women's basketball competitions hosted by Mozambique
2011 in women's basketball